Ghastly may refer to:
"Ghastly" Graham Ingels, a comic book and magazine illustrator with EC Comic
Ghastly (DJ), American DJ from Los Angeles
Sir Graves Ghastly character created by Cleveland-born actor Lawson J. Deming (1913-2007) for the popular television show of the same name

See also
Ghastly Ones, band
 Major Dr Ghastly, a character from Evil Con Carne
 Blood Rites (film) (AKA The Ghastly Ones), 1968 horror film
Gastly, Pokémon number 92